Pól Jóhannus Justinussen (born 13 January 1989) is a Faroese international footballer who plays for the Faroese team NSÍ, as a defender or winger. He previously played for Valur in Iceland and for the Faroese football clubs B68 Toftir, EB/Streymur and GÍ Gøta.

Justinussen made his international debut for the Faroe Islands national football team in 2010. In February 2012 he signed a contract with Danish Superliga club AaB Aalborg until the end of the Danish season in June, having been on trial with the club on two occasions in the months before signing. After his contract expired in the summer he signed with NSÍ Runavík in July. He played there until November 2013, when he joined EB/Streymur. He signed a two-year deal, but eventually re-signed for NSÍ Runavík in 2014.

References

External links

Justinussen's profile on Faroesoccer.com

1989 births
Living people
Faroese footballers
People from Runavík
Faroe Islands international footballers
Valur (men's football) players
B68 Toftir players
NSÍ Runavík players
AaB Fodbold players
Danish Superliga players
Faroese expatriate footballers
Expatriate men's footballers in Denmark
Faroe Islands under-21 international footballers
GÍ Gøta players
Association football defenders
Faroe Islands youth international footballers